Marko Memedović (born 18 January 1991) is a Serbian footballer who currently plays for New Zealand club North Shore United.

Honours
Sloga Kraljevo
Serbian League West: 2010–11
Radnik Surdulica
Serbian First League: 2014–15

External links
 
 Marko Memedović profile at utakmica.rs 
 

1991 births
Living people
Sportspeople from Kraljevo
Serbian footballers
Association football midfielders
FK Sloga Kraljevo players
FK Sloboda Užice players
FK Metalac Gornji Milanovac players
Serbian First League players
Serbian SuperLiga players
FK Mornar players
OFK Petrovac players
FK Radnik Surdulica players
FK Sloga Petrovac na Mlavi players
FK Mačva Šabac players
FK Radnički Pirot players
North Shore United AFC players
Montenegrin First League players